The Aerococcaceae are a family of Gram-positive lactic acid bacteria, including the bacterium that causes gaffkaemia in lobsters.

References

Lactobacillales